Be Thankful for What You Got is a studio album issued in 1974 by the soul singer William DeVaughn. It includes the best-selling song also titled "Be Thankful for What You Got".

Track listing

Personnel
 William DeVaughn - vocals, songwriting
 John Davis - organ, piano, sax, flute, synthesizer
 Jerry Cohen - clavinet, piano
 Norman Harris - guitar
 Pal Rakes - guitar
 Bobby Eli - guitar
 Hugh McDonald - bass
 Rusty Jackman - bass
 Al Price - drums
 Earl Young - drums
 Larry Washington - percussion
 Vince Montana - vibraphone
 Don Renaldo - strings, horns
 Nadine Felder - background vocals
 Gwen Oliver - background vocals
 Carl Paroulo - engineering, mixing
 Doug Fern - engineering
 Joe Tarsia - engineering, mixing
 Wes Farrell - art direction
 Richard Germinaro - illustration
 Big Cigar - album design

Potential confusion
DeVaughn's second album, originally released as Figures Can't Calculate, also includes the track "Be Thankful for What You Got" (in a different version); this second album was later reissued on CD by Unidisc as Be Thankful for What You Got and by Hot Productions as Be Thankful for What You've Got.

References

1974 albums
Albums recorded at Sigma Sound Studios
Soul albums by American artists
1974 debut albums